Buddy Giovinazzo (born 1957) is an American independent filmmaker and author who is known for his gritty, low-budget debut film, Combat Shock, and his collection of harrowing short stories of low urban life in his 1993 anthology, Life Is Hot in Cracktown.

Born May 5, 1957 in New York City, Buddy grew up in Staten Island. He went to the College of Staten Island where he graduated with a Masters in Cinema, later teaching film there as well.

He is the brother of Rick Giovinazzo, who is a composer, orchestrator, and the star of his premier film, Combat Shock. His cousin is television and film actor, Carmine Giovinazzo.

Bibliography
During a time when it was difficult to get a project made for Giovinazzo after his debut film, Combat Shock, he turned to writing novels instead and teaching film.

The published writings of Buddy Giovinazzo:
 Life is Hot in Cracktown (1993) [Thunder's Mouth Press] 
 Poetry & Purgatory (1996) [Thunder's Mouth Press] 
 Broken Street (2000) In German [Maas] 
 Potsdamer Platz (2004) [No Exit Press] 

His anthology, Life is Hot in Cracktown, was adapted into a feature film by Giovinazzo himself as writer and director.

Filmography
 Combat Shock (1986) Writer/Director/Editor/Producer/Actor
 Maniac 2: Mr. Robbie (1986) Director/Producer (short promo film)
 Jonathan of the Night (1987) Writer/Director/Producer
 She's Back (1989) Writer
 No Way Home (1996) Writer/Director/Actor
 Fallen Arches (1998) Actor
 The Unscarred (1999) Director/Producer
 Life is Hot in Cracktown (2009) Writer/Director (Novel)
 The Theatre Bizarre (2011) Co-director

Television
Sometime during or after The Unscarred, Giovinazzo left the United States for Berlin, Germany where he published his fourth novel, Potsdamer Platz and directed episodes for various German crime programs:

 "Tatort" (3 episodes, 2003-2009)
 Platt gemacht (2009) TV episode
 Das Ende des Schweigens (2007) TV episode
 3 x schwarzer Kater (2003) TV episode
 "Der Kriminalist" (3 episodes, 2008)
 Ruhe in Frieden (2008) TV episode
 Eiskalter Tod (2008) TV episode
 Avalon (????) TV episode
 "Polizeiruf 110" (2 episodes, 2003-2006)
 Mit anderen Augen (2006) TV episode
 Tiefe Wunden (2003) TV episode
 "Wilsberg" (2 episodes, 2005)
 Todesengel (2005) TV episode
 Schuld und Sünde (2005) TV episode

References

External links

2002 Interview with Sex and guts Magazine
Interview with Orenda Film on No Way Home
Cinema Crazed review of Combat Shock
Unrated Magazine - Cinema of the Extreme review of No Way Home
Behind the scene photos of Life is Hot in Cracktown

Living people
American screenwriters
American film directors
College of Staten Island alumni
1957 births
20th-century American writers
21st-century American writers
20th-century American male writers
College of Staten Island faculty